The 1929 Atlantic hurricane season was among the least active hurricane seasons in the Atlantic on record – featuring only five tropical cyclones. Of these five tropical systems, three of them intensified into a hurricane, with one strengthening further into a major hurricane (Category 3 or higher on the Saffir–Simpson hurricane wind scale). The first tropical cyclone of the season developed in the Gulf of Mexico on June 27. Becoming a hurricane on June 28, the storm struck Texas, bringing strong winds to a large area. Three fatalities were reported, while damage was conservatively estimated at $675,000 (1929 USD).

The second storm, nicknamed the Bahamas hurricane, developed north of the Lesser Antilles. The storm moved through the Bahamas at this intensity and later struck Florida while slightly weaker. Overall, this hurricane resulted in 59 deaths and at least $9.31 million in damage. The next three tropical cyclones did not impact land, with the last transitioning into an extratropical cyclone on October 22. Until the Atlantic hurricane reanalysis project researched the season in 2010, the final two systems were considered the same tropical cyclone.

The season's activity was reflected with an accumulated cyclone energy (ACE) rating of 48, below the 1921–1930 average of 76.6. ACE is a metric used to express the energy used by a tropical cyclone during its lifetime. Therefore, a storm with a longer duration will have high values of ACE. It is only calculated at six-hour increments in which specific tropical and subtropical systems are either at or above sustained wind speeds of 39 mph (63 km/h), which is the threshold for tropical storm intensity. Thus, tropical depressions are not included here.

Timeline

Systems

Hurricane One 

After barometric pressures in the western Gulf of Mexico had been low for several days, the steamship Chester O. Swain encountered a disturbance of "probably moderate intensity" offshore Texas on June 28. A tropical storm developed in the southwestern Gulf of Mexico on the previous day. It moderately intensified and by early on June 28, the storm became a hurricane. While offshore Texas, the hurricane peaked with winds of 90 mph (150 km/h). The storm then accelerated westward across the Southwestern United States and weakened to a tropical storm early on June 29. However, it was still of "considerable intensity" while passing near El Paso about 24 hours later. Thus, the system was thought to have remained a tropical storm until early on June 30. Several hours later, the storm dissipated over Arizona.

The storm brought hurricane-force winds to portions of Texas, including as far inland as Yorktown in DeWitt County. Additionally, a 60 to 80 mi (95 to 130 km) path observed gale force winds as far from the coast as Bexar, Kendall, Kerr, and Medina counties. Wind impacts were significant, with a "conservative" estimate of $310,000 in damage inflicted on crops, while buildings, windmills, power, telephone, and telegraph lines suffered about $365,000 in damage. There were three deaths in Wharton County, as well as several injuries. Outside of the area of wind damage, rainfall was considered "highly beneficial" to crops and range.

Hurricane Two 

The Great Bahamas Hurricane of 1929 

The second storm of the season originated from a tropical wave that developed in the vicinity of Cape Verde on September 11. The depression drifted just north of due west while strengthening slowly, becoming a tropical storm early on September 22. Later that day, the storm curved northwestward. Around midday on September 23, it intensified into a hurricane. While turning southwestward on the following day, the hurricane began to undergo rapid deepening.

While crossing through the Bahamas, the storm struck Eleuthera and Andros, on September 25 and September 26, respectively. Late on September 27, the system weakened to a Category 3 hurricane and re-curved northwestward. At 13:00 UTC the next day, the hurricane made landfall near Tavernier, Florida. The storm then entered the Gulf of Mexico and continued weakening, falling to Category 2 intensity late on September 28. While approaching the Gulf Coast of the United States, the hurricane weakened to a Category 1 hurricane. Early on October 1, it made landfall near Panama City Beach, Florida. A few hours later, the hurricane weakened to a tropical storm and then became extratropical over southwestern Georgia shortly thereafter. The remnants continued northeastward up the East Coast of the United States, until entering Canada and dissipating over Quebec early on October 5.

In the Bahamas, the hurricane brought strong winds and large waves to the archipelago. At Nassau, a weather station observed a wind gust of 164 mph (264 km/h). Within the city alone, 456 houses were destroyed, while an additional 640 houses suffered damage. On Abaco Islands, 19 homes were demolished. The hurricane damaged or destroyed 63 homes and buildings on Andros. Telegraph service was disrupted. There were 48 deaths in the Bahamas. Throughout the Bahamas and the Florida Keys, numerous boats and vessels were ruined or damaged. At the latter, strong winds were observed, with a gust up to 150 mph (240 km/h) in Key Largo. However, damage there was limited to swamped fishing boats and temporary loss of electricity and communications. Farther north, heavy rains flooded low-lying areas of Miami. A devastating tornado in Fort Lauderdale damaged a four story hotel, a railway office building, and several cottages. In the Florida Panhandle, storm surge destroyed several wharves and damaged most of the oyster and fishing warehouses and canning plants. Overall, there was approximately $2.36 million in damage and three deaths in Florida; eight others drowned offshore.

Tropical Storm Three 

Historical weather maps indicate that a low pressure area was embedded within a west to east oriented stationary front over the northwestern Atlantic Ocean on September 24. Early on September 25, a tropical depression formed just west of Bermuda and strengthened into a tropical storm later that day. Around 02:00 UTC on September 26, a ship observed a barometric pressure of  – the lowest while the storm was tropical. Four hours later, sustained winds peaked at 60 mph (95 km/h). The extratropical remnants accelerated northeastward and then east-northeastward, before dissipating east-southeast of Newfoundland on September 29.

Tropical Storm Four 

Early on October 15, a low pressure area developed into a tropical storm, while located about 625 mi (1,005 km) southwest of Flores Island in the Azores. The storm moved west-southwestward and slowly strengthened. Early on October 18, it curved northwestward and began to accelerate. Late the next day, the storm became extratropical, while located about 535 mi (860 km) south-southeast of Cape Race, Newfoundland. The extratropical remnants of the storm continued northeastward, until dissipating well southeast of Newfoundland on October 20.

Hurricane Five 

Moving eastward, the depression intensified into a tropical storm early the next day. Later on October 20, it curved northeastward and accelerated. The storm intensified into a hurricane at 12:00 UTC on October 21. The remnants moved north-northwestward and dissipated early on October 23.

See also 

 List of tropical cyclones
 Atlantic hurricane season
 1900–1950 South-West Indian Ocean cyclone seasons
 1920s Australian region cyclone seasons

References

External links 

 Monthly Weather Review

 
Articles which contain graphical timelines
1929 meteorology
1929 natural disasters